UAAP Season 71 was the 2008–2009 season of the University Athletic Association of the Philippines. The University of the Philippines (UP) hosted this season, which coincided with the centennial anniversary of the University's establishment. It opened on July 5, 2008 with an elaborate ceremony held at the Araneta Coliseum.

Universal rules
Two-round eliminations, the top 4 teams enter the semifinals, with the top 2 seeds possessing the twice-to-beat advantage. Semifinal winners play in the best-of-three finals.
If there are ties in the standings, the standard tiebreaking procedure will be used per sport, except for the last seed, in which an extra game will be held to break the tie.
Exception: In basketball and volleyball, an extra game will be played regardless of the position and tiebreaking procedure recommended in a sport.
If a team wins all of their elimination round games, the postseason will be scrapped and that team will win the championship outright.
Exceptions:
In basketball, the team that wins all elimination round games will have the thrice-to-beat advantage in the finals.
In volleyball, the team that wins all elimination round games advances outright to the finals.
In both instances, the #3 and #4 teams play for a berth to face the #2 seed with the twice-to-win advantage in the semifinals.

Basketball

The UAAP Season 71 Basketball tournament began on July 5, 2008 at the Araneta Coliseum in Cubao, Quezon City. The tournament host was University of the Philippines and tournament commissioner was Andres "Chito" Narvasa, Jr.

Seniors division

Men's tournament

Elimination round

Playoffs

Awards
Most Valuable Player: 
Rookie of the Year:

Women's tournament

Elimination round

Playoffs

Awards
Most Valuable Player: 
Rookie of the Year:

Juniors division

Boys' tournament

Elimination round

Playoffs

Awards
Most Valuable Player: 
Rookie of the Year:

Volleyball

Seniors division

Men's tournament

Elimination round

Team standings

Tiebreakers:
UP defeated Ateneo 3–2 in the third-seed game.
Adamson defeated FEU in both of their elimination round games.

Playoffs

Awards
Most Valuable Player: 
Best Digger: 
Best Server: 
Best Attacker: 
Best Blocker: 
Best Receiver: 
Best Setter:

Women's tournament

Elimination round

Team standings

Playoffs

Awards
Most Valuable Player: 
Rookie of the Year: 
Best Blocker: 
Best Server: 
Best Receiver: 
Best Setter: 
Best Digger: 
Best Attacker: 
Best Scorer:

Juniors division

Boys' tournament

Elimination round

Team standings

With UE sweeping the elimination round, the Red Pages were declared automatic champions and the Finals was not held.

Awards
 Most Valuable Player: 
 Rookie of the Year:

Girls' tournament

Elimination round

Team standings

With UST sweeping the elimination round, the Tigress Cubs were declared automatic champions and the Finals was not held.

Awards
 Most Valuable Player: 
 Rookie of the Year:

Beach volleyball
The UAAP Beach Volleyball tournament started on September 6, 2008 at the University of the East Caloocan Grounds. UST and FEU were declared outright champions after sweeping the men's and women's tournaments, respectively.

Men's tournament

Awards
Most Valuable Player: 
Rookie of the Year:

Women's tournament

Awards
 Most Valuable Player: 
 Rookie of the Year:

Football
The UAAP Football tournament opened on January 18, 2009. Games were played at the Erenchun and Ocampo Football Fields of the Ateneo de Manila University.

Men's tournament

Elimination round

Team standings

Match-up results

Finals
FEU had the twice to beat advantage.

Women's tournament

Elimination round

Team standings

Match-up results

Finals
La Salle had the twice to beat advantage.

Baseball
The UAAP Baseball tournament opened on January 11, 2009. Games were played at the Rizal Memorial Baseball Stadium.

Men's tournament

Elimination round

Team standings

Match-up results

Softball
The UAAP Softball tournament opened on January 10, 2009. Games were played at the UST Open Field.

Women's tournament

Elimination round

Team standings

Match-up results

Chess
The UAAP Season 71 Chess tournament started on August 9, 2008, at the Tan Yan Kee Student Center of the University of Santo Tomas.

Seniors division

Men's tournament

Team standings
Standings after 12 rounds

Awards
Most Valuable Player: 
Rookie of the Year:

Women's tournament

Team standings
Standings after 12 rounds

Awards
Most Valuable Player: 
Rookie of the Year:

Juniors division

Boys' tournament

Team standings
Standings after 12 rounds

Awards
Most Valuable Player: 
Rookie of the Year:

Taekwondo
The UAAP Season 71 Taekwondo tournaments were held on September 13 and September 17, 2008 at the Far Eastern University Gym.

Seniors division

Men's tournament

Team standings
Final.

Awards
Most Valuable Player: 
Rookie of the Year:

Women's tournament

Team standings
Final.

Awards
Most Valuable Player: 
Rookie of the Year:

Juniors division

Boys' tournament

Team standings
Final.

Awards
Most Valuable Player: 
Rookie of the Year:

Judo
The UAAP Judo Championships ran from October 4 to October 5, 2008 at the UP College of Human Kinetics Gym. For the third straight year, Judo was a demonstration sport in the boys' (junior's) division.

Seniors division

Men's tournament

Team standings
Final results:

Awards
Most Valuable Player: 
Rookie of the Year:

Women's tournament

Team standings
Final results:

Awards
Most Valuable Player: 
Rookie of the Year:

Juniors division

Boys' tournament

Team standings
Final results:

Awards
Most Valuable Player: 
Rookie of the Year:

Badminton
UE and FEU won all of their elimination round games in the men's and women's tournaments respectively to clinch the championship outright.

Men's tournament
Awards:
Most Valuable Player: 
Rookie of the Year: 
Most Improved Player:

Women's tournament
Awards
Most Valuable Player: 
Rookie of the Year: 
Most Improved Player:

Tennis
The UAAP Season 71 Tennis tournaments began on January 10, 2009 at the Rizal Memorial Sports Complex Tennis Courts.

Men's tournament

Elimination round

Awards
Most Valuable Player: 
Rookie of the Year:

Women's tournament

Elimination round

Table tennis
The UAAP Season 71 Table Tennis tournament began on September 20, 2008 at the Blue Eagle Gym inside the Ateneo de Manila University campus.

Seniors division

Men's tournament
Team standings

Awards
 Most Valuable Player:
 Rookie of the Year:

Women's tournament
Team standings

Awards
 Most Valuable Player: 
 Rookie of the Year:

Juniors' division

Boys' tournament

Team standings

Awards
 Most Valuable Player: 
 Rookie of the Year:

Swimming
The UAAP Season 71 Swimming Championships started on September 25, 2008 at the Trace Aquatics Centre in Los Baños, Laguna. Four titles were disputed, namely: the men's division, the women's division, the boys' division and the girls' division

Team ranking is determined by a point system, similar to that of the overall championship. The points given are based on the swimmer's/team's finish in the finals of an event, which include only the top eight finishers from the preliminaries. The gold medalist(s) receive 15 points, silver gets 12, bronze has 10. The following points: 8, 6, 4, 2 and 1 are given to the rest of the participating swimmers/teams according to their order of finish.

Seniors division

Men's tournament

Team standings
Final results:

Awards
Most Valuable Player: 
Rookie of the Year:

Women's tournament

Team standings
Final results:

Awards
Most Valuable Player: 
Rookie of the Year:

Juniors division

Boys' tournament

Team standings
Final results:

Awards
Most Valuable Player: 
Rookie of the Year:

Girls' tournament

Team standings
Final results:

Awards
Most Valuable Player: 
Rookie of the Year:

Cheerdance

The 2008 Cheerdance Competition was held on September 7, 2008 at the Araneta Coliseum in Cubao, Quezon City. This year, the pep squads performed before a record attendance of 23,443 students, alumni and fans.

Cheer dance competition is an exhibition event. Points for the general championship are not awarded to the participants.

Stunner awardee: Frances Fleta

General championship summary 
The general champion is determined by a point system. The system gives 15 points to the champion team of a UAAP event, 12 to the runner-up, and 10 to the third placer. The following points: 8, 6, 4, 2 and 1 are given to the rest of the participating teams according to their order of finish.

Medals table

Seniors' division

Juniors' division

General championship tally

Seniors' division

Juniors' division

Individual awards
Athlete of the Year:
Seniors': 
Juniors':

References

See also
NCAA Season 84

 
2008 in Philippine sport
2008 in multi-sport events
2009 in Philippine sport
2009 in multi-sport events